"Crocodile Shoes" is a single by Jimmy Nail. It was written for the television drama Crocodile Shoes, and became a chart hit for Nail in the United Kingdom, Ireland, and Sweden in 1994 and 1995. It is featured on the album of the same name.

Track listings
7-inch and cassette single
A. "Crocodile Shoes" – 4:11
B. "Calling Out Your Name (Jed's Demo)" – 3:20

CD single
 "Crocodile Shoes" – 4:11
 "Calling Out Your Name (Jed's Demo)" – 3:20
 "Once Upon a Time (Jed's Demo)" – 1:54

Charts

Weekly charts

Year-end charts

Certifications

See also
 Jimmy Nail discography

References

1994 singles
1994 songs
East West Records singles
Jimmy Nail songs